Pride Microfinance Limited (PMFL), is a microfinance deposit-taking institution (MDI) in Uganda. It is licensed by the Bank of Uganda, the central bank and national banking regulator.

PMFL provides financial services to that segment of the Ugandan population who are not served or are unable to access financial services through Ugandan commercial banks. PMFL's focus are the micro, small, and medium size entrepreneurs. As an MDI, PMFL is a Tier III Financial Institution. It is therefore prohibited from dealing in foreign exchange and cannot issue checking accounts.

, the institution's total assets were valued at approximately US$56.84 million (UGX:147.4 billion), with shareholders' equity of approximately US$18.1 million (UGX:46.97 billion). As of December 2013, Pride Microfinance employed 585 people and served 373,667 customers.

History
PMFL was founded in 1995 as a non-governmental organization with the support of the Norwegian Agency for Development Cooperation. Its major objective was to offer credit to the poor, targeting those in the agricultural sector.

In 1999, it was incorporated as a limited company and changed its name to Pride Africa Uganda Limited.

In 2003, the Uganda government acquired 100 percent shareholding in the enterprise, changing the name to Pride Microfinance Limited Uganda.

In 2005, it attained the status of  an MDI according to the Banking Act of 2003.

It is a member of the Association of Microfinance Institutions In Uganda.

In February 2016, Ugandan media reported that the government was planning to merge PMFL with PostBank Uganda, to form an agricultural bank.

Products

As of June 2014, the products offered included:

Deposit products
 Pride Smart Savings Account
 Pride Akiba Savings Account
 Fixed Deposit Account
 Minor’s Savings Account
 Group Savings Account
 Loan Insurance Fund
 Save As You Earn (SAYE) Account

Loan products
 Group Guaranteed Loans
 Individual Loans
 Salary Loans
 Mortgage and Asset Financing Loan
 Agricultural Loan Scheme
 School Fees Loan

Other services
 Money Transfer Services - Through Western Union and MoneyGram
 Death, disability, and catastrophe insurance products to loan clients - Offered through AIG Insurance.

Branch network
The entire branch network of the company included the following locations, as of June 2014:
 Arua Branch - Avenue Road, Arua
 Bugiri Branch - Mivule Road, Bugiri
 Bukoto Branch - Victoria Office Park, 6-9 Ben Kiwanuka Okot Close, Bukoto, Kampala Main Branch	
 Bushenyi Branch - High Street, Bushenyi
 Buwenge Branch - Kamuli Road, Buwenge	
 Kampala City Branch - Mukwano Arcade, Kampala
 Fort Portal Branch - Rukidi Road, Fort Portal
 Gulu Branch - Cemetery Road, Gulu
 Entebbe Road Branch - Metropole  House, Entebbe Road, Kampala
 Hoima	Branch - Old Tororo Road, Hoima
 Ibanda Branch - High Street, Ibanda
 Iganga Branch - Main Street, Iganga
 Ishaka Branch - Rukungiri Road, Ishaka
 Jinja	Branch - Main Street, Jinja
 Kabalagala Branch - Muyenga Road, Kabalagala
 Kabale Branch - Kabale Road, Kabale
 Kabingo Branch - Kabingo Trading Center, Isingiro District
 Kabwohe Branch - Mbarara Road, Kabwohe	
 Kagadi Branch - High Street, Kagadi
 Kasese Branch - Saad Building, Kasese
 Katwe Branch - Katwe Road, Katwe
 Kawempe Branch - Bombo Road, Kawempe	
 Lira Branch - Oboe Avenue, Lira
 Lugazi Branch - Ntenga Road, Lugazi	
 Masaka Branch - Kampala Road, Masaka	
 Mbale Branch - Republic Street, Mbale
 Mbarara Branch - High Street, Mbarara	
 Mukono Branch - Kampala-Jinja Highway, Mukono	
 Nakawa Branch - UMA Show Ground, Nakawa
 Naakulabye Branch - Hoima Road, Basiriak Building, Naakulabye
 Nateete Branch - Masaka Road, Nateete	
 Pader Branch - Main Street, Pader
 Rukungiri Branch - Rukungiri Road, Rukungiri
 Soroti Branch - Solot Avenue, Soroti	
 Wandegeya Branch - Bombo-Gayaza Roundabout, Wandegeya

See also
 Banking in Uganda
 List of banks in Uganda
 FINCA Uganda Limited
 Finance Trust Bank

References

External links
 History of Pride Microfinance

Banks of Uganda
Companies based in Kampala
Banks established in 1995
1995 establishments in Uganda
Government-owned companies of Uganda